Alexandra Simons de Ridder (born 29 October 1963) is a German equestrian and Olympic champion. She won a gold medal in team dressage at 
the 2000 Summer Olympics in Sydney with the team from Germany.

References

1963 births
Living people
German dressage riders
Olympic equestrians of Germany
German female equestrians
Equestrians at the 2000 Summer Olympics
Olympic gold medalists for Germany
Olympic medalists in equestrian
Medalists at the 2000 Summer Olympics